Synalus is a genus of Australian crab spiders first described by Eugène Simon in 1895. , it contains only two species from southern New South Wales and Tasmania.

References

Thomisidae
Araneomorphae genera
Spiders of Australia